The Aero A.32 was a biplane built in Czechoslovakia in the late 1920s for army co-operation duties including reconnaissance and tactical bombing. While the design took the Aero A.11 as its starting point (and was originally designated A.11J), the aircraft incorporated significant changes to make it suited for its new low-level role.

Like the A.11 before it, the A.32 provided Aero with an export customer in the Finnish Air Force, which purchased 16 aircraft in 1929 as the A.32IF and A.32GR (which spent most of their service lives as trainers). They were assigned numbers AEj-49 – AEj-64 and were used until 1944. At least one aircraft has survived, AEj-59 is on the show of the Päijänne-Tavastia Aviation Museum.

A total of 116 of all variants were built.

Variants
 A.32IF : Attack version for Finland, powered by a 450-hp (336-kW) Isotta Fraschini Asso Caccia piston engine. One machine.
 A.32GR : Attack version for Finland, powered by a 450-hp (336-kW) Gnome-Rhone built Bristol Jupiter radial piston engine. 15 machines.
 Ap.32 : Improved version for the Czech Air Force. Also known as the Apb.32.

Operators

Czechoslovakian Air Force
Czechoslovakian National Security Guard
 
Finnish Air Force
 
Slovak Air Force (1939–45)

Specifications (A.32)

Gallery

See also

External links

Photos at Ugolok Neba site

1920s Czechoslovakian military reconnaissance aircraft
1920s Czechoslovakian bomber aircraft
A032
Single-engined tractor aircraft
Biplanes
Aircraft first flown in 1927